Oshitani is a Japanese surname. Notable people with the surname include:

Hitoshi Oshitani (born 1959), Japanese virologist
Yuki Oshitani (born 1989), Japanese football player

Japanese-language surnames